The 1946–47 season was the 74th season of competitive football in Scotland and the 50th season of the Scottish Football League.

Scottish League Division A

Champions: Rangers

Scottish League Division B

Scottish League Division C

Cup honours

Other Honours

National

County

 * - aggregate over two legs

Highland League

Scotland national team

Key:
 (H) = Home match
 (A) = Away match
 BHC = British Home Championship

See also
 1946–47 Rangers F.C. season

Notes and references

External links
Scottish Football Historical Archive Broken link